Isobutane, also known as i-butane, 2-methylpropane or methylpropane, is a chemical compound with molecular formula HC(CH3)3. It is an isomer of butane. Isobutane is a colourless, odourless gas.
It is the simplest alkane with a tertiary carbon atom. Isobutane is used as a precursor molecule in the petrochemical industry, for example in the synthesis of isooctane.

Production
Isobutane is obtained by isomerization of butane.

Uses
Isobutane is the principal feedstock in alkylation units of refineries. Using isobutane, gasoline-grade "blendstocks" are generated with high branching for good combustion characteristics. Typical products created with isobutane are 2,4-dimethylpentane and especially 2,2,4-trimethylpentane.

Solvent
In the Chevron Phillips slurry process for making high-density polyethylene, isobutane is used as a diluent. As the slurried polyethylene is removed, isobutane is "flashed" off, and condensed, and recycled back into the loop reactor for this purpose.

Precursor to tert-butyl hydroperoxide
Isobutane is oxidized to tert-butyl hydroperoxide, which is subsequently reacted with propylene to yield propylene oxide. The tert-butanol that results as a by-product is typically used to make gasoline additives such as methyl tert-butyl ether (MTBE).

Miscellaneous uses
Isobutane is also used as a propellant for aerosol spray cans.

Isobutane is used as part of blended fuels, especially common in fuel canisters used for camping.

Refrigerant
Isobutane is used as a refrigerant. Use in refrigerators started in 1993 when Greenpeace presented the Greenfreeze project with the former East German company . In this regard, blends of pure, dry "isobutane" (R-600a) (that is, isobutane mixtures) have negligible ozone depletion potential and very low global warming potential (having a value of 3.3 times the GWP of carbon dioxide) and can serve as a functional replacement for R-12, R-22 (both of these being commonly known by the trademark Freon), R-134a, and other chlorofluorocarbon or hydrofluorocarbon refrigerants in conventional stationary refrigeration and air conditioning systems.

As a refrigerant, isobutane poses a fire and explosion risk in addition to the hazards associated with non-flammable CFC refrigerants. Substitution of this refrigerant for motor vehicle air conditioning systems not originally designed for isobutane is widely prohibited or discouraged.

Vendors and advocates of hydrocarbon refrigerants argue against such bans on the grounds that there have been very few such incidents relative to the number of vehicle air conditioning systems filled with hydrocarbons.

Nomenclature
The traditional name isobutane was still retained in the 1993 IUPAC recommendations, but is no longer recommended according to the 2013 recommendations. Since the longest continuous chain in isobutane contains only three carbon atoms, the preferred IUPAC name is 2-methylpropane but the locant (2-) is typically omitted in general nomenclature as redundant; C2 is the only position on a propane chain where a methyl substituent can be located without altering the main chain and forming the constitutional isomer n-butane.

References

External links
International Chemical Safety Card 0901
NIOSH Pocket Guide to Chemical Hazards

Alkanes
Butane
E-number additives
Propellants
Refrigerants